Gornji Hruševec is a village in Croatia. It is connected by the D31 highway.

History
In the village of Upper Hrusevec is a Roman archaeological site of "Ad Fines" (local called "Burgenland"). In the Middle Ages, Upper Hrusevec was noble Predij Hruševec, Hruševački ruled by nobles  (lat. praedium Hrwssowcz).

References 

Populated places in Zagreb County